Cecil Harry Phipps (25 October 1896–1968) was an English footballer who played in the Football League for Halifax Town and West Ham United.

References

1896 births
1968 deaths
English footballers
Association football forwards
English Football League players
West Ham United F.C. players
Halifax Town A.F.C. players
Loughborough Corinthians F.C. players